The Sailfin dragonet (Callionymus pusillus) is a species of dragonet common in the Eastern Atlantic,  where it occurs on the Portuguese coast to as far north as Lisbon and south to Morocco, and also in the northern Mediterranean including the Adriatic, Aegean and Black seas as well as the coastsLebanon and Israel. It occurs on the southern Mediterranean shore as far east as Tunisia  Males of this species grows to a length of  TL while females reach a length of  TL. In the areas of the Mediterranean where it occurs it is one of the commonest dragonet species, as it is the only species that has been recorded within many protected areas. The males are territorial, aggressively defend their territories from other males and like other dragonets this species undergoes complex breeding behaviour which has 4 phases. This starts with courtship, the male and female then form a pair before ascending to the surface where they release eggs and milt. The spawning season runs from May to August in the Mediterranean and the eggs and larvae are pelagic. This species feeds mainly on small benthic invertebrates such as worms and small crustaceans.

The sailfin dragonet has three upwardly directed spines on the preoperculum  and differs from other species of dragonet by having a first dorsal fin which is lower than the second dorsal fin. The second dorsal fin has long rays which extend into long filaments. These filaments extend beyond the caudal fin. The male is brightly coloured with 14 to 16 silvery transverse lines fringed with black on its body and with blue streaks on the fins. The female is beige with small whitish spots.

References 

P
Fish of Europe
Fish of Western Asia
Fish of the Atlantic Ocean
Fish of the Mediterranean Sea
Fish of the Black Sea
Fish described in 1809
Taxa named by François-Étienne de La Roche